Pycnoplinthopsis is a genus of flowering plants belonging to the family Brassicaceae.

The species of this genus are found in Himalaya to Tibet.

Species:
 Pycnoplinthopsis bhutanica Jafri

References

Brassicaceae
Brassicaceae genera